Princess Alexandra Ivanovna Kurakina, née Panina (Russian: Александра Ивановна Куракина; February 14, 1711 – February 22, 1786) was the daughter of Lieutenant-General and Senator Ivan Panin, the sister of the famous counts Nikita and Peter Panin, the grandmother of Princes Alexander and Alexey Kurakin and poet Yury Neledinsky-Meletsky.

Biography

Origin
Alexandra Ivanovna (according to some sources Agrafena) was the eldest child in the family. By father, Ivan Vasilyevich, belonged to the noble family of Panin. On the mother's side, Agrafena Vasilievna Everlakova, was related to the Naryshkins and Leontievs.

Her grandfather, clerk Vasily Alekseevich Everlakov, was very close to Tsarevich Alexei Petrovich. In a number of sources of compilation nature, it is stated that Everlakov's wife was Tatyana Danilovna, the sister of the Most High Prince Alexander Menshikov; whereas in modern scientific works the relations of Menshikov with Everlakovs are not mentioned.

Marriage
Alexandra Ivanovna received a good home education, spent her childhood and youth in Pernov, where her father was the commandant.

At 19, she was married to Prince Alexander Borisovich Kurakin (1697 – 1749), Privy Councilor and Conference Minister, who had just returned from Paris, where he was the Plenipotentiary Ambassador. Their wedding took place on April 26, 1730. Alexandra's marriage was the beginning of the rise of the Panin family.

The Kurakin family held a high position at court. Alexander Borisovich under Empress Anna Ioannovna was a supporter of Ernst Johann von Biron and became his official jester and amusement. With the help of intrigue, he managed to maintain his position in the reign of Elizabeth Petrovna. In 1749, Alexander Ivanovna widowed. She had eight children left in her arms.

Life in Moscow
Having lost her husband, Alexandra Ivanovna permanently lived in Moscow in the huge house that she had inherited on Myasnitskaya street, where the entire city was going to on permanent holidays and feasts. In this house, Princess Kurakina was surrounded by a large family, children and grandchildren; she also brought up the sons of her only son who died in 1764, Prince Boris Alexandrovich Kurakin, later known Princes Alexander and Alexey Borisovich; to them, the grandmother, until the end of her life, retained affection, being in correspondence with them and keenly interested in their brilliant career.

By the beauty and ease of syllable, clarity of thought, the letters of Alexandra Ivanovna are among the best examples of the epistolary heritage of the 18th century. She wrote equally easily in Russian and French.

After marrying her daughters and the disintegration of a large family, deserted the huge Kurakin house, in which she remained alone with her unmarried daughter, Princess Agrafena Alexandrovna, continued to serve, thanks to her, as a connecting center for the whole family, among which she enjoyed great respect and prestige.

Alexandra Ivanovna did not like feeling her own age and did not let him feel it to others. She was very mobile and hospitable, at the age of 66 she went hunting, visiting her brother, Count Peter Panin, in his Dugino estate in Smolensk and led a secular lifestyle, while remaining very moderate in her tastes and habits. In old age she wrote about herself:

Old Kurakina, as they called her in Moscow, was engaged in the widest charity. Pious and religious, Alexandra Ivanovna had in her house a home church in the name of the Holy Trinity, where she defended the mass every morning, led a great acquaintance and friendship with prominent clergy, between whom she especially distinguished the Archbishop of Rostov Samuel.

Princess Kurakina died 75 years old on February 11, 1786, and was buried in the Cathedral of the Moscow Novospassky Monastery, where the inscription carved on the headstone ends with the words:

Children
In marriage, Princess Alexandra Ivanovna Kurakina had one son:
Boris-Leonty Aleksandrovich (1733 – 1764), senator, president of the Board of Economy and Board of Chamber. He was married to the famous beauty Elena Stepanovna Apraksina (1735 – 1769).
and eight daughters:
Anna Alexandrovna (1731 – 1749);
Tatyana Alexandrovna (1732 – 1754), was the first wife of Alexander Neledinsky-Meletsky (1729 – 1804);
Agrafena Alexandrovna (1734 – 1791), from December 9, 1749, was a maid of honor of Empress Elizabeth Petrovna, and during the reign of Catherine the Great was considered "on leave". She lived mainly in Moscow with her mother, she was not married;
Catherine Alexandrovna (1735 – 1802), married to Prince Ivan Lobanov-Rostovsky;
Alexandra Alexandrovna (1736 – 1739);
Natalya Alexandrovna (1737 – 1798), State Lady, the wife of Field Marshal Prince Nikolai Repnin;
Anastasia Alexandrovna (died 1939, in the third month);
Praskovya Alexandrovna (June 13, 1741 – November 5, 1755), died of fever.

References

External links
 Alexandra Kurakina

1711 births
1786 deaths
18th-century women from the Russian Empire
Russian nobility